Prince Joyi was a Korean Royal Prince as the fourth and youngest son of Taejo of Goryeo and Queen Jeongdeok. He was a Buddhism.

References

Korean princes
Year of birth unknown
Year of death unknown